Leptosiphon is a genus of flowering plants in the Polemoniaceae family. Many included species were formerly classified as members of the genus Linanthus.  Some species of this genus are grown as ornamental plants.

Species include:
Leptosiphon acicularis - bristly linanthus
Leptosiphon ambiguus - serpentine linanthus
Leptosiphon androsaceus - false babystars
Leptosiphon aureus - golden linanthus
Leptosiphon bicolor - true babystars
Leptosiphon bolanderi - Bolander's linanthus
Leptosiphon breviculus - Mojave linanthus
Leptosiphon ciliatus - whiskerbrush
Leptosiphon filipes - thread linanthus
Leptosiphon floribundum - manyflower linanthus
Leptosiphon grandiflorus - largeflower linanthus
Leptosiphon harknessii - Harkness flaxflower
Leptosiphon jepsonii - Jepson's linanthus
Leptosiphon latisectus - Coast Range linanthus
Leptosiphon lemmonii - Lemmon's linanthus
Leptosiphon liniflorus - narrowflower flaxflower
Leptosiphon minimus - babystars
Leptosiphon montanus - mustang clover
Leptosiphon nudatus - Tehachapi linanthus
Leptosiphon nuttallii - Nuttall's linanthus
Leptosiphon oblanceolatus - Sierra Nevada linanthus
Leptosiphon pachyphyllus - Sierra linanthus
Leptosiphon parviflorus - variable linanthus
Leptosiphon pygmaeus - pygmy linanthus
Leptosiphon rattanii - Rattan linanthus
Leptosiphon septentrionalis - northern linanthus
Leptosiphon serrulatus - Madera linanthus

External links

 
Polemoniaceae genera